"Could It Be You" is the hit single recorded by American musician Brandyn H*Wood Bordeaux

Track listing

Charts

References 

2010 singles
2010 songs